The New England Steamrollers were a former Arena Football League team based in Providence, Rhode Island. The team played in the AFL's 1988 season. The Steamrollers were one of four teams to enter the AFL in 1988, and along with the New York Knights and Los Angeles Cobras were folded following the season.

The Steamrollers were based out of Providence, Rhode Island and played their home games at the Providence Civic Center. They were the first professional football team of any kind to play in Providence since the Providence Steam Roller folded in 1933 and the first non-minor league professional sports franchise to play in the city since the NBA's Providence Steamrollers folded in 1949.

The coach of the Steamrollers was former Boston Patriots All-Pro quarterback Babe Parilli.

History

In 1988, Concert and fight promoter, Frank J. Russo, and jeweler, Robert Andreoli, purchased a limited partnership from the Arena Football League to own the rights to a Providence, Rhode Island team. The team's first move was the hiring of Head Coach, Babe Parilli in March. After a 3-9 season, the Steamrollers didn't achieve the dollar amount that Russo and Andreoli thought they would, and the franchise folded.

Notable players

Roster

Arena Football League Hall of Famers

All-Arena players
The following Steamrollers players were named to All-Arena Teams:
WR/DB Jim Hockaday
OL/DL Sylvester Bembery, Kevin Murphy

Head coaches

Season-by-season

|-
|1988 || 3 || 9 || 0 || 5th || --
|}

References

External links
 New England Steamrollers at ArenaFan.com

Defunct Arena Football League teams
American football teams established in 1988
American football teams disestablished in 1988
Steamrollers
American football teams in Rhode Island
1988 establishments in Rhode Island
1988 disestablishments in Rhode Island